Anatoly Bifov (born 7 January 1963, Baksan) is a Russian political figure and a deputy of the 6th, 7th, and 8th State Dumas.
 
From 1999 to 2003, he was the deputy of the Zolsky District Council. In 2001, he became the general director of the Sarmakovsky wine and vodka factory. From 2003 to 2008, he was the deputy of the Parliament of the Kabardino-Balkarian Republic of the 3rd convocation. From June 2008 to June 2011, he headed the Baksan administration. In 2009, he joined the Communist Party of the Russian Federation. In 2011, he became the deputy of the 6th State Duma. In 2016 and 2021, he became a member of the 7th and 8th State Dumas.

References
 

 

1963 births
Living people
Communist Party of the Russian Federation members
21st-century Russian politicians
Eighth convocation members of the State Duma (Russian Federation)
People from Baksan